Tam Đường is a rural district of Lai Châu province in the Northwest region of Vietnam. The city borders Phong Thổ district, Sìn Hồ district, Tân Uyên district, Lai Châu and Lào Cai province.

The district capital lies at Tam Đường.

Demographics
As of 2020 the city had a population of 52,470, covering an area of 662.92 km².

Administrative divisions
Lai Châu City is officially divided into 13 commune-level sub-divisions, including the township of Tam Đường and 12 rural communes (Bản Bo, Bản Giang, Bản Hon, Bình Lư, Giang Ma, Hồ Thầu, Khun Há, Nà Tăm, Nùng Nàng, Sơn Bình, Tả Lèng, Thèn Sin).

See also
Tam Duong bus crash

References

Districts of Lai Châu province